The Committee on Armed Services (sometimes abbreviated SASC for Senate Armed Services Committee) is a committee of the United States Senate empowered with legislative oversight of the nation's military, including the Department of Defense, military research and development, nuclear energy (as pertaining to national security), benefits for members of the military, the Selective Service System and other matters related to defense policy. The Armed Services Committee was created as a result of the Legislative Reorganization Act of 1946 following U.S. victory in the Second World War. The bill merged the responsibilities of the Committee on Naval Affairs (established in 1816) and the Committee on Military Affairs (also established in 1816).

Considered one of the most powerful Senate committees, its broad mandate allowed it to report some of the most extensive and revolutionary legislation during the Cold War years, including the National Security Act of 1947.  The committee tends to take a more bipartisan approach than other committees, as many of its members formerly served in the military or have major defense interests located in the   states they come from. The committee's regular legislative product is the National Defense Authorization Act (NDAA), which has been passed by Congress and signed into law each year since 1962.

The current chair is Democrat Jack Reed of Rhode Island, and the Ranking Member is Republican Roger Wicker of Mississippi (2023).

Jurisdiction
According to  the Standing Rules of the United States Senate, all proposed legislation, messages, petitions, memorials, and other matters relating to the following subjects are referred to the Armed Services Committee:

 Aeronautical and space activities pertaining to or primarily associated with the development of weapons systems or military operations.
 Common defense.
 Department of Defense, the Department of the Army, the Department of the Navy, and the Department of the Air Force, generally.
 Maintenance and operation of the Panama Canal, including administration, sanitation, and government of the Canal Zone.
 Military research and development.
 National security aspects of nuclear energy.
 Naval petroleum reserves, except those in Alaska.
 Pay, promotion, retirement, and other benefits and privileges of members of the Armed Forces, including overseas education of civilian and military dependents.
 Selective service system.
 Strategic and critical materials necessary for the common defense.

Members, 118th Congress

Subcommittees

Chairs

Committee on Military Affairs, 1816–1947

Committee on Naval Affairs, 1816–1947

Committee on Armed Services, 1947–present

Historical committee rosters

111th Congress 

Source: 

Subcommittees

112th Congress 

Source: 

Subcommittees

113th Congress 

Source: 

Subcommittees

114th Congress

115th Congress

116th Congress

117th Congress

Source:

See also
 United States House Committee on Armed Services
 List of current United States Senate committees

Footnotes

External links

 (archive)
 Senate Armed Services Committee Report on Torture released November 20, 2008.
 Historic archives at Internet Archive:

 

Armed Services
Veterans' affairs in the United States
1816 establishments in the United States
Organizations established in 1816
Civil–military relations